The South Korean men's national under 20 ice hockey team is the national under-20 ice hockey team in South Korea. The team represents South Korea at the International Ice Hockey Federation's World Junior Hockey Championship Division II.

Record
1990 IIHF World U20 Championship. Finish: 5th in Pool C (21st overall)
1991 IIHF World U20 Championship. Finish: 5th in Pool C (21st overall)
1992 IIHF World U20 Championship. Finish: 6th in Pool C (22nd overall)
1993 IIHF World U20 Championship. Finish: 8th in Pool C (24th overall)
2003 IIHF World U20 Championship. Finish: 1st in Division III (35th overall)
2004 IIHF World U20 Championship. Finish: 2nd in Division II Group B (25th overall)
2005 IIHF World U20 Championship. Finish: 2nd in Division II Group B (25th overall)
2006 IIHF World U20 Championship. Finish: 3rd in Division II Group B (28th overall)
2007 IIHF World U20 Championship. Finish: 4th in Division II Group A (30th overall)
2008 IIHF World U20 Championship. Finish: 3rd in Division II A (27th overall)
2009 IIHF World U20 Championship. Finish: 3rd in Division II A (27th overall)
2010 IIHF World U20 Championship. Finish: 4th in Division II A (29th overall)
2011 IIHF World U20 Championship. Finish: 3rd in Division II Group B (27th overall)
2012 IIHF World U20 Championship. Finish: 6th in Division II Group A (28th overall)
2013 IIHF World U20 Championship. Finish: 2nd in Division II Group B (30th overall)
2014 World Junior Ice Hockey Championships. Finish: 1st in Division II Group B (29th overall)
2015 World Junior Ice Hockey Championships. Finish: 3rd in Division II Group A (25th overall)
2016 World Junior Ice Hockey Championships. Finish: 6th in Division II Group A (28th overall)
2017 World Junior Ice Hockey Championships. Finish: 1st in Division II Group B (29th overall)
2018 World Junior Ice Hockey Championships. Finish: 2nd in Division IIA (24th overall)
2019 World Junior Ice Hockey Championships. Finish: 6th in Division IIA (28th overall)
2020 World Junior Ice Hockey Championships. Finish: 1st in Division IIB (29th overall)
2021 World Junior Ice Hockey Championships. Division I, II, and III games have been cancelled due to COVID-19 pandemic.

References

National team
Ice hockey
Korea, South
Ice hockey